Nonoka (written: 野々花, 乃々華 or ののか in hiragana) is a feminine Japanese given name. Notable people with the name include:

, Japanese announcer and newscaster
, Japanese entertainer and gravure idol
, Japanese freestyle wrestler
, Japanese singer and member of the girl group E-girls

Fictional characters
, protagonist of the anime series Celestial Method
, a character in the video game Photo Kano

Japanese feminine given names